A special election was held in  to fill two vacancies caused by the deaths of George Holcombe (J) on January 14, 1828 and Hedge Thompson (A) on July 23, 1828.  The elections were held at the same time as the election for the 21st Congress.

Election results

Sinnickson and Randolph took their seats on December 1, 1828.  Randolph was also elected to the 21st Congress.

See also
List of special elections to the United States House of Representatives

References

New Jersey 1828 at-large
New Jersey 1828 at-large
1828 at-large
New Jersey at-large
United States House of Representatives at-large
United States House of Representatives 1828 at-large